Roncoferraro is a comune (municipality) in the Province of Mantua in the Italian region of Lombardy, located about  southeast of Milan and about  southeast of Mantua.

Roncoferraro borders the following municipalities: Bagnolo San Vito, Bigarello, Castel d'Ario, Mantua, San Giorgio di Mantova, Sustinente, Villimpenta.

History
According to the tradition, the frazione of Governolo was the seat of the meeting between Pope Leo I and Attila in 452. Also in Governolo the condottiero Giovanni dalle Bande Nere was shot by a cannonball in 1526, later dying out of the wounds received.

During the Italian Wars of Independence, Governolo, due to its strategically important bridge over the Mincio River, was the location of two battles:
The first (April 24, 1848) allowed the small Modenese army to push back an Austrian inroad against the fortress of Mantua.
In the second (July 18, 1848) the Piedmontese general Eusebio Bava conquered back the bridge.

References

External links
 Official website

Cities and towns in Lombardy